Laura A. Crivello is an American attorney and judge.  She has served as a Wisconsin Circuit Court Judge in Milwaukee County since 2018.

Life and career 

Crivello graduated from the University of Wisconsin - Milwaukee before receiving her Juris Doctor from the  Marquette University Law School in 1993. For twenty-four year, she worked as a prosecutor, focusing on prosecutions related to drugs and gang violence. In her last years at the Milwaukee County District Attorney’s office, she was team leader for the office High Intensity of Drug Trafficking Area (HIDTA) team. In 2017, the ‘’Wisconsin Law Journal’’ named her a recipient of its “Women of the Law” award. In 2018, an inmate was accused of trying to order a hit on her after she helped send him to prison.

In 2018, Crivello was appointed to the Wisconsin Circuit Court in Milwaukee County by then-Governor Scott Walker, a Republican. She kept her seat when she ran uncontested 2019.

References

External links

 Laura Crivello at Ballotpedia

People from Milwaukee County, Wisconsin
Wisconsin lawyers
Wisconsin state court judges
21st-century American judges
Living people
Year of birth missing (living people)